"Scotch and Soda" is a song recorded by The Kingston Trio in 1958 and first released on the album The Kingston Trio; it also appeared on the live album Once Upon a Time and on various compilations.

The Kingston Trio also released the song as a single in the United States in April 1962. It was also released in 1969 as the B-Side to the single "One Too Many Mornings".

Composition
"Scotch and Soda" was discovered by the Trio through the parents of the baseball player Tom Seaver, who had first heard it in  a hotel piano lounge in 1932 when on their honeymoon in Phoenix, Arizona.  They liked it so much that they had the piano player write it down for them so it would be "their song." One member of the trio (Dave Guard) was dating Seaver's older sister (Katie) at that time, and heard the song on a visit to the Seaver home.  Although it is credited to Guard (he had it copyrighted in his name on March 30, 1959), the trio never discovered the real songwriter's name, though they searched for years.

Cover Versions
Hank Thompson covered the song on his 2000 release, Seven Decades.
Manhattan Transfer covered the song on their 1976 album, "Coming Out."

Notes

Year of song unknown
The Kingston Trio songs
Songs about alcohol
1930s songs
Songwriter unknown